Super Agent is an American reality television series about nine sports agents competing to be selected for defensive lineman Shaun Cody. The series was shown on Spike TV in 2005.

In each episode the sports agents were given assignments that allowed them to demonstrate their skills and talents as agents for Cody as he deliberated on which agent would ultimately be hired to manage his multimillion-dollar American football career.

Cast Members 

Starring: Shaun Cody, (himself), Blue Chip 2005 NFL Draft Prospect

Host: Tony Gonzalez, NFL Tight End - Kansas City Chiefs

Guest Host (Episode 4): Simeon Rice, NFL Defensive End - Tampa Bay Buccaneers

John Bermudez, Agent

Justin Breece, Agent

Scott Casterline, Agent

Jeff Guerriero, Agent

Harold Lewis, Agent

Tim McIlwain, Agent

Marlon Tucker, Agent

Lisa Van Wagner, Agent

Don West, Jr., Agent

Director and producers 

Directed by: Brendon Carter

Location producer: Bryan Bultz

Supervising producer: Brendon Carter

Executive producer: Rick de Oliveira

Executive producer: James DuBose

Supervising story producer: Kristian House

External links

Official Shaun Cody website

Spike (TV network) original programming
2000s American reality television series
2005 American television series debuts
2005 American television series endings